Eight expansion packs have been released for the 2004 life simulation video game The Sims 2, the second major title in The Sims series. All expansion packs were developed by Maxis Redwood Shores and published by Electronic Arts. Expansion packs tend to focus on major new features, with many objects, clothes, styles, neighborhoods and life states are geared towards the pack's major theme. The first expansion pack, University, was released on March 1, 2005. The last expansion pack, Apartment Life, was released on August 25, 2008.

University 

The Sims 2: University is the first expansion pack for The Sims 2 developed by Maxis Redwood Shores and published by Electronic Arts. It was released on March 1, 2005, to mixed reception. The expansion pack adds a new aging stage to Sims – Young Adult. Once they reach this life period, they can go to University to earn a degree, allowing them to take up any one of four graduate-exclusive careers. The pack added several key gameplay elements which have been included in all expansions succeeding it. University has won two Editor's Choice awards from syndicated game review publications.

Background 
In 2004, Electronic Arts announced that it was planning on releasing a new expansion pack for The Sims 2 in March 2005. University was first announced in mid-November. A university-themed expansion pack was discussed for The Sims but the technology did not support it. Maxis wanted to give the feel of a crowded dormitory without having a large amount of Sims on the screen at a time, so NPCs disappear upon entering a private room.

Gameplay

College 
University introduces the college system, which introduces classes, majors, and rewards. Students have the choice of eleven different majors, each requiring the advancement of specific skills in order to get the highest possible grades. Sims must complete four years of university to graduate. If a Sim fails a semester, they are placed on academic probation and must repeat the semester. Each student starts off with a budget separate from any family they may have come from. There are several ways to receive income as a student, including tutoring and physically training other Sims. Students may also play instruments or freestyle for tips or work part-time as cafeteria workers and baristas. Some NPC students are members of a secret society. University includes the Influence system, where Sims gain a number of Influence points when achieving specific goals, which can be spent on directing other Sims to do certain things. Sims now have a Lifetime Want which puts the Sim in Platinum mood for the rest of their lives if achieved.

University adds the Young Adult life stage between Teen and Adult. Only Sims at college become Young Adults, and Sims who do not attend college make the transition directly to adults. University comes with three pre-made college neighborhoods: Sim State University, La Fiesta Tech, and Académie Le Tour, for their respective pre-made The Sims 2 neighborhoods. Each neighborhood has three further types of residential: dorms, private housing, and Greek Houses. In communal dorms, NPC Sims fill in the house vacancies. A Sim with enough scholarship money may start out in a private house. Greek Houses function the same as a dormitory, but have increased Relationship and Motive benefits. The pre-made neighborhoods generally include recreation centers, libraries, and other student centers.

Other additions 
University adds an instrument system, composed of the new Guitar, Drum kit and Bass objects. Multiple Sims can play together. Sims can make money by playing at their homes or at community lots. Although Sims cannot have actual vocalists, the new action "Freestyle" or "Freestyle For Tips" will allow another Sim to rap along (in Simlish) to the instruments being played or a cappella to have fun and annoy or entertain other Sims nearby. Students also have a variety of new objects centered around college life, including a fruit juice keg, togas, ramen noodles, and a bubble blowing machine.

University adds new social interactions, including pranks, instruments, and pillow fights. University adds several categories of interactions, including "Influence To..." and "Hang Out". Sims can comprise study groups, providing social interaction while boosting grades. A common interaction between University Sims is "Kicky Bag", a hacky sack-like game in which multiple Sims try to keep aloft a small bag filled with beans by kicking it to each other. University has new NPCs in the form of cheerleaders, mascots, cafeteria workers, coaches, professors, and students.

University introduces Zombies, which can result from the use of a Resurrect-O-Nomitron (a career reward for the paranormal career track) or through the use of cheat codes. When using a Resurrect-O-Nomitron, the player pays the Grim Reaper to bring back a deceased Sim. Depending on the amount of money that the player offers the Grim Reaper, the Sim may be resurrected perfectly, with less skill/personality points, as a zombie, or not at all. Zombies have gray skin, shamble when walking, and dislike whoever brought them back from the grave.

Reception 
University received a "Platinum" sales award from the Entertainment and Leisure Software Publishers Association (ELSPA), indicating sales of at least 300,000 copies in the United Kingdom. University received 81% from aggregate site Metacritic.

Nightlife 

The Sims 2: Nightlife is the second expansion pack for The Sims 2, released in North America on September 13, 2005. It was released for macOS on March 27, 2006. The expansion pack centers on the new Downtown area, which has various activities, such as bowling, karaoke, dining and dancing, as well as a photo booth, and includes a dating minigame which allows player to engage in their Sims' relationships in greater depth.

Gameplay 
Nightlife is a spiritual successor to The Sims: Hot Date, which focused on new social interactions and locations for Sims to visit, such as a dance club or romantic restaurant. Nightlife follows in a similar theme. Some of the items are also similar to the ones found in The Sims: House Party and The Sims: Superstar.

Nightlife adds the option to add a downtown sub-neighborhood to each proper neighborhood. The pre-made downtown is simply called Downtown, and contains several shops, restaurants, nightclubs and other community lots, as well as home lots. These places are perfect for dates, or group gatherings. It does not include pre-made Sims, though.

New additions include inventories, new interactions, and over 125 new objects, including cars. NPCs that a player's Sim dates can now leave gifts or hate letters at the Sim's home, depending on the success of particular dates. Some of the new NPCs include party DJs, a Gypsy Matchmaker and Vampires.

Nightlife adds two new aspirations. The Pleasure aspiration is assigned in exactly the same way as any of the other five aspirations. Sims with this aspiration crave enjoyment in many different ways, whilst they fear embarrassment. Sims may receive wants such as 'juggle' and 'jump on lounge'. The ReNuYu SensoOrb, an object which enables any Sim to change their aspiration, can fail like other Aspiration Reward objects when the Sim's Aspiration Meter is low. When this happens, the Sim using it receives the Grilled Cheese Aspiration, and all his or her wants and fears will be superseded with ones revolving around grilled cheese sandwiches, such as "Make Grilled Cheese Sandwich" or "Be rejected for Talk about Grilled Cheese Sandwich."  If University is installed, the Sim's Lifetime Want will also change.

Vampires 
Nightlife introduces NPC Vampires. If a Sim builds a strong relationship with a vampire, which they can meet in community lots, they can ask to be bitten and thus, become stricken with Vampirisim. Vampires have sharp teeth, red eyes, and pale skin, and can turn into a bat and fly. Vampires' needs do not decay at all during the night. Vampire Sims are also immortal and will not age, although Teen vampires will age if sent to college and again upon graduation.

The main weakness of a vampire is that during the day, their needs decay faster than those of normal Sims. If a Vampire tries to go out of the house during the day, their needs will drop down to zero fast, and eventually, they will combust and die. A vampire can avoid these dangers by sleeping in a coffin during the day, a new object introduced in the expansion pack. Vampirism can be cured with a potion.

Other additions 
Nightlife adds private cars to the series for the first time. The pack includes five car models with different paintjobs such as: a hatchback, a pickup truck, a minivan, a sedan car, and a sports car. The player can install an alarm in the car, take the kids to school, drive to work, and go to community lots. The official website offered a garage set download that allows players with any combination of games to have cars. There are several models and colors available. In addition, driveways and garages can be built into the Sim's lot.

Also new to Nightlife is a new diagonal shaped swimming pool tool, which can be used to create extensive shapes. Two new radio stations are also added: the Oldies and Classical stations.

Nightlife introduces the concept of fury. Of limited duration, this generally affects which social interactions are accepted. It is most likely to occur when a spouse is caught cheating with another Sim. If another Sim becomes furious at the player's Sim, their Sim will be subjected to vandalism, such as having their newspaper stolen, or their trash can kicked over. Fury can also be caused by the player, if they decide to be very mean to the other Sim. Fury can be resolved by waiting for the furious timer to stop ticking or paying the Sim.

Reception 
Nightlife received a "Platinum" sales award from the Entertainment and Leisure Software Publishers Association (ELSPA), indicating sales of at least 300,000 copies in the United Kingdom. Nightlife received 76% from aggregate sites GameRankings and Metacritic.

Open for Business 

The Sims 2: Open for Business is the third expansion pack for The Sims 2, released in North America on March 2, 2006. The pack allows Sims to run a home or community lot-based business.

Gameplay 
The main change to the core game introduced by Open for Business is a new neighborhood type — the Shopping District, the default one being named Bluewater Village. A number of Sims live here, such as a toy-making family, a woman who owns a home-based flower shop, a family bakery and a rich tycoon who owns a nightclub and an electronics shop.

Community lots are more flexible now, removing many of the gameplay restrictions that were present on them in the original game. Players can now save the game while their Sims are visiting community lots. Reloading their household automatically takes the player to the community lot where the Sims are located.

Like the previous expansions, new Wants and Fears and interactions were added, including a new Lifetime Want and several new interactions for children. Some changes to items from the base game are also present. For example, you can lock a door to just non-employees. There are new objects in this expansion. While furniture styles and the build-mode selection have been expanded, the biggest difference is the addition of business-oriented items such as shelves, elevators, and crafting centers that Sims can use to create things to sell.

Several features from Nightlife and University, such as influence levels, turn ons and turn offs, are available to players without those expansion packs.

Main features 
The concept of running a business is the pack's main feature, incorporating elements of a business simulation game. The game allows the player to control various aspects of running a business including picking which products to sell, hiring and firing employees, crafting goods, and restocking shelves. The game also rewards the player for meeting several predetermined goals; also, a mystery shopper may visit the business and critique it.

Open for Business adds new functionality to a Sim's productivity around the house. Sims are able to craft new items, including toys, flower arrangements and robots. Additional items include those aimed specifically at enhancing the business setting like an old-style Cash register, Beauty salon chairs, child-oriented toys, and Mission-style furniture.

Also added is the Servo, a household robot, which can perform basic tasks and function like a Sim in regards to Social interaction. Some new items, called "Bots" in general, aim to increase productivity on a lower scale than Servo's operation, usually performing one task, such as cleaning the floor, watering plants, bringing food or stunning burglars. Servos can be built by Sims with a gold robotics badge. Servos can be activated as either a female or male, then become playable Sims for the player to control. A Servo will copy the traits, aspiration and the turn-on/offs of the Sim that activates it, and usually have maximized skills. Servos have only four needs; power, fun, social, and environment. Power can be restored by recharging during the day (solar based recharging), or sleeping in a bed if the sun isn't out. They will do chores automatically, and will clean, cook, or repair for the normal Sims around the house. Servos do not age, and hence will not die from age. If a Servo is neglected from its needs too much, it will end up destroying itself.

Open For Business adds more functionality to Build Mode. Elevators are a new way for Sims to travel between floors. Arched columns (Two columns with an arc shape joining them) are available in the Build Mode catalog. Domed, conical and octagonal roofs in different sizes are now available. Players may also add awnings.

A new "talent badge" system is also added. A Sim must repeatedly perform an action to raise that badge's level. The talent badges include: Sales, Register, Restocking, Salon, Flower Arranging, Robotics and Toy Making.

Music 
A new musical genre titled new wave is included. A new station known as Shopping is also included, which features the "Buy Mode" music from The Sims.

Reception 
Open for Business received a "Gold" sales award from the Entertainment and Leisure Software Publishers Association (ELSPA), indicating sales of at least 200,000 copies in the United Kingdom.

Open for Business received 78% and 79% averages from aggregate sites GameRankings and Metacritic respectively. Eurogamer gave the game 7 out of 10 saying that the game is "confusing at first".

Pets 

The Sims 2: Pets is the fourth expansion pack in The Sims 2 series of games published by Electronic Arts. It was also sold as a stand-alone game for GameCube, PlayStation 2, Nintendo DS, Game Boy Advance, PlayStation Portable and Wii. Pets was announced on July 26, 2006, and released on October 18, 2006, in  North American and via download, as well as on October 20, 2006, in European regions. It was released on October 26, 2006, in Australia.

It was released for the Wii on June 12, 2007, being the first The Sims title on the platform. In Australia, one Australian dollar per game sold, from at least 50,000 copies of the game, was donated to the RSPCA. Unlike the other expansions, this game does not have a new neighborhood. Instead, new lots (with Sims living in them) are available for placement in the existing neighborhoods. Pets has sold over 6 million copies. The console version differs from previous Sims console games, as there is no forced story mode for the player to accomplish, making gameplay more akin to the PC versions.

A sequel to Pets on Nintendo DS, The Sims 2: Apartment Pets, was released on August 26, 2008.

Gameplay

Pets 
Sims can own cats, dogs, birds and gerbils. Pets features 75 pre-made breeds of dogs and thirty pre-made breeds of cats. Create-A-Pet is similar to "Create-a-Sim", where a user builds a human Sim characters. In Create-a-Pet, players may customize a cat or dog by choosing patterns and colors of coat, body shape, facial structure, and personality, which determines playfulness, neatness, loyalty, aggression, and intelligence.

Pets have motives like their Sim counterparts. Sims and pets are similar except for the absence of the "Room" motive, which "Scratching" replaces in cats and "Chewing" in dogs. Sims may also train their pets to do various tricks. Pets can follow one of three career paths: Security, Showbiz and Services. When pets get promoted, various pet-related "unlockables" are made available along with a code so players can share these items with others.

Pets have three life stages: Puppy/Kitten, Adult, and Elder. The length of a pet's elder hood is selected at random, however there is an aspiration reward object which will extend the pet's life by a few days with each use. Pets are able to breed, and doing so will produce a litter. The number of puppies or kittens is dependent on the number of Sims and pets currently in the house. Players can play with up to eight Sims or six pets at one time, although one can only have a total of six Sims and/or pets in a household altogether.

Pets can be trained to do various tricks, and they can be scolded or praised. The tricks include sit, stay, shake, come here, guard, roll over, sing, and more. In the Game Boy Advance version, they can be taught to stand up on two legs and juggle, or other unusual tricks. When the pet learns a new trick, it adds to the Sim and pet relationship. There are a few unpleasant acts: pets may relieve themselves where it is inappropriate, dig up the yard, chew up the newspaper or floor, scratch up furniture, or dig out the trash. It is helpful to praise a pet and give it a treat after it has done something favorable.

Werewolves are a type of supernatural creature which the Sim can interact with or even be transformed into. Sims exist as Werewolves only during night hours. During these hours, the werewolf's energy will go up, but their hunger will decrease more quickly as well. A Werewolf can teach a pet faster than humans and can fight against burglars. They might occasionally howl at the moon, howl at player's command, or howl to summon wolves.

To become a werewolf, players must build up a relationship with any wolf with glowing eyes (the werewolf pack leader). The pack leader will eventually "nibble" the Sim it was interacting with, causing it to become a werewolf. Once a Sim has become a werewolf they may "savage" another Sim to turn them into a werewolf. Werewolves are not featured on the consoles versions.

Reception 
Pets received a "Gold" sales award from the Entertainment and Leisure Software Publishers Association (ELSPA), indicating sales of at least 200,000 copies in the United Kingdom.

The Microsoft Windows, macOS, GameCube, PlayStation 2, PlayStation Portable and Wii versions of Pets received mainly mixed to positive reviews from critics, while the Nintendo DS and Game Boy Advance versions of the game received mixed to negative reviews.

The Australian video game talk show Good Games two reviewers gave the game a 6.5/10 and 8/10.

Seasons 

The Sims 2: Seasons is the fifth expansion pack for The Sims 2. It was developed by Maxis Redwood Shores and released in North America on March 1, 2007. Aspyr released a macOS port of the game in June 2007.

Seasons enhances gameplay by adding seasons and weather mechanics. Each season lasts around five sim days and brings with it new challenges and gameplay options. A new type of Sim, known as a PlantSim is also added. They operate using different mechanics to normal sims. The expansion pack introduced a new neighbourhood called Riverblossom Hills. Like previous games, it has a storyline but no linear gameplay.

Gameplay

Weather and seasons 
Seasons introduces two new game play concepts to The Sims 2 series: weather and seasons. Each season lasts for approximately five Sim days
and players have the option to alter their order of progression.

Sims are able to build snowmen during the Winter, rake fallen leaves in Autumn, jump in puddles during Spring and occasionally experience heat stroke in Summer. Besides being a visually interactive addition, each season enhances Sim's attributes in certain ways.

There is weather within each season, including rain, hail, lightning storms, and snow (there is another type of weather called the rain of fire due to the malfunction of the new aspiration reward object, which is a weather control machine). Weather may also adversely affect Sims.

New in Seasons is a thermometer that shows how hot or cold a Sim is. The thermometer goes red when a Sim is too hot or has sunburn and goes cold when a Sim has been playing in the snow for too long. However, this does present disadvantages. An example is a Sim getting a cold or getting too hot after too many showers.

For example, heat in summer may cause a Sim to experience heatstroke or receive a sunburn. Sims who are outside during the winter may feel cold, though they can be warmed in various ways. Other Sims have the option of a "thaw" interaction, provided their relationship is high enough. Children who are allowed to get too cold or too hot do not die, but are instead taken away by social services. Rarely, Sims who go outside during a rainstorm can be struck by lightning, but this more commonly happens to trees or other objects. A Sim who survives gets blackened hair and skin that do not come off until the Sim's next shower or bath. Also, if a Sim stays out in a hailstorm for too long they will die.

PlantSims is a new type of Sim that comes with Seasons. PlantSims have green skin with vine-like tattoos, special leaf or flower made hair and yellow eyes, and will obtain a gold gardening badge when they become a PlantSim, if they didn't already have one. In order to become a PlantSim, a Sim must spray their orchard trees or plants in excess. The PlantSim condition can be cured by calling a Garden Club member or gypsy matchmaker and buying a potion.

PlantSims only age within three life stages: toddler, adult and elder. Besides aging differences, they have three needs: sunlight, water and love. PlantSims also gain a prank interaction (pollen cloud), the ability to release spores of happiness, and the ability to reproduce. Spawned offspring begin life as toddlers and have a gold gardening badge and the same skills and personality as their parent. However, their facial genes are a combination of the parent and a hidden NPC named Ideal Plantsim.

With a high enough gardening skill, Sims can talk to plants and turn a hum-drum orange tree, vegetable or fruit plant grow to vibrant status, thereby increasing the harvest yield. The new juicer object allows Sims to create custom juices from their own harvest.

Development 
Seasons was officially announced in an EA press release on December 12, 2006. In it, Rod Humble, Vice President and Studio Head of Maxis said Seasons really delivers what the players have been asking for—a unique gaming experience offering new seasonal, outdoor activities that players can engage in. And because each season unfolds differently, winter, spring, summer and fall will look different from the year before, guaranteeing a fresh experience each season," Although the official announcement occurred on December 12, the expansion had been announced on the website six days before, and flyers found in Pets had also advertised it.

Weather was originally planned to be an element in The Sims 2, The Sims 2 preview at E3 2003 demonstrated rain and lightning effects. However, it suffered from technical glitches. Rain would fall inside sim's homes and Maxis was unable to resolve it before launch. Hacks did exist to make rain possible in the game, but these too were glitchy and were not supported by Maxis.

On December 1, 2006, several major fansites were invited to Maxis Redwood Shores to take a look at the game. The build shown at the event was still in a pre-alpha stage. Final decisions regarding content and gameplay had not been made.

The pack received several new graphical features. The snow effects were created using a technique called procedural generation. The developers also went to great lengths to ensure that snow would appear on custom-created objects. Pools were also updated with effects such as reflective-water and real-time shadows. The flooring and walls of pools were also made customisable.

Bon Voyage 

The Sims 2: Bon Voyage is the sixth expansion pack released in The Sims 2 series of PC games. It was released in North America on September 4, 2007. The pack focuses on travelling, similar to The Sims: Vacation. This is the last expansion pack for The Sims 2 to be ported to macOS.

Gameplay 
There are three vacation destinations in Bon Voyage: Three Lakes (the mountain woodland), Takemizu Village (the Far East) and Twikkii Island (the beach). The player can choose to take a single Sim, or a group on a vacation to one of these areas. While on vacation, Sims do not have to work or go to school.

Each destination has its own secret lot which can be found by getting a secret map. One of the ways a player can get a map is by digging on terrain. Players can also create custom destinations or buy vacation homes. There are many new NPCs including ninjas, pirates, fire dancers, local chefs, various hotel staff, etc. Sims can learn different things such as dances, massage and gestures from the locals at vacation destinations.

There are also tours that Sims can go on. Random chance cards can be answered which determine the outcome of the tour. There are also several souvenirs that Sims can buy that are different for each vacation destination. After returning home from a successful vacation, a Sim may receive some temporary vacation bonuses, like an extra want, or improved job performance. A less successful vacation might cause jet lag instead. An option called "Real Estate" can be selected and the Sim can purchase a Vacation Home in the destination of their choice.

Two new types of roofs are included; they are pagodas and curved edge roof. There are also Asian-style windows, doors and wallpaper. Some new objects include hotel theme object sets, massage table, hot springs, tropical, mountain and far east foliage, etc. The sauna, tent and hammock are new objects. There are also several new hairstyles and clothes that include kimono, swimming gear and hula skirts. Sims may also acquire jewelry like watches, earrings, nose piercings and bracelets during Create-a-Sim and on vacation. Each vacation place gives Sims new jewelry that they can set to their different outfits.

Beaches provide a new range of Sim interactions like "comb for shells" or "build a sand castle", or even "get in" to swim in the ocean, and "sunbathe", which can tan or burn the Sim. Players can also place beaches at a neighborhood. Some hotels are placed on beaches.

The second available area is the Woodlands, which is similar to a campground. Sims may camp in a tent or stay at a wooden lodge. The Sims may also sit around a campfire or go log riding. Sims who find a secret map may discover the secret of Bigfoot while visiting the "secret lot".

The Far East allows Sims to experience Eastern culture. In the Far East location, Sims may play mahjong, get massages and drink tea at special tables. Sims may even see a ninja and may learn the art of teleportation. They may meet some of the locals and learn how to bow from them. A secret lot is also available here.

Sims can take snapshots or movies on vacation. The player may also walk to other lots instead of driving or calling a cab. The new radio stations from this pack include: Local music, World music, Big Band, and Vacation themed music. It is also possible to create hotels for Sims.

FreeTime 

The Sims 2: FreeTime is the seventh expansion pack in The Sims 2 video game series. With this expansion, Sims can pursue employment in five new careers including dance, entertainment, intelligence, oceanography and architecture.

The ten hobbies included in the expansion pack are fitness, cooking, music/dance, sports, nature, science, films/literature, gaming, tinkering, and arts/crafts. Every Sim is created with a predetermined "preferred" hobby which cannot be modified by the player. While the bar is filled, the Sim is "in the zone", shown graphically as a white glow around the Sim; causing their needs to decay more slowly than usual, as to allow extra time on that hobby.

Gameplay and development 
FreeTime includes a new neighborhood named Desiderata Valley. The expansion also adds new secret lots and adds a special character, a Genie. A gypsy will come to the player's Sim house if the Sim is enthusiastic over a hobby or has high Lifetime Aspiration and will drop off the lamp on the player's property. The Genie will grant the Sim three wishes though the wishes have a chance of backfiring. Once the Sim uses the three wishes, the Genie will disappear.

More video games are playable on Sims' computers and game consoles. All of these games are real-life EA and Maxis games, such as Spore, FIFA 08 and the then-upcoming The Sims 3. Other games such as pool and chess also contribute to the hobby enthusiasm. Sims can also challenge each other in a video game competition in community lots.  The televisions now also feature movies that Sims can watch, which are movie clips featured in "How Do You Play?" ad campaign.

Hobbies 
There are ten hobbies in FreeTime. Each offers different unlockable benefits or new activities and also a pass to enter into secret lots. Doing an activity which is related to the specific hobby increases enthusiasm to that hobby. As enthusiasm increases for each hobby, there are a number of new actions introduced to the Sim in that area. These rewards and benefits will stay constant for the Sim provided the hobby enthusiasm is kept high enough to warrant them. The highest reward is to be in 'The Zone'.

The Arts & Crafts hobby centers around activities that are related to creating and discussing artwork, such as painting, and introduces two new Talent Badges: Pottery and Sewing. In addition, an activity table is available allowing toddlers and children to paint and play with blocks.

Cooking, watching cooking shows and having meals are activities related to culinary. Cuisine hobby allows Sims to unlock new foods: chips, cheese and appetizers. Moreover, Sims may now enter a food contest by submitting a dish to be judged. Finally, a new nectar table is available in buy mode.

Sims can now choose the cover, title and plot when writing a novel. Players may now choose which book for their Sim to read instead of reading a single generic book. Sims can also discuss books they have read, and a variety of films can now be viewed on the television.

Other than working out, swimming or performing yoga, Sims with a high enough interest in Fitness can go jogging, get protein drinks out of their fridge, and use an exercise bike. In addition, athletic outfits have been given a greater selection from more than just sweatsuits and children are also given athletic wear.

Sims can now play the violin and the synthesizer as well as the piano (and guitar, bass and drums if University is installed). They can also practice ballet on the ballet barre, enter dance contests and also teach their toddlers nursery rhymes.

Nature-loving Sims find gardening, fishing, bug collecting and birdwatching interesting. If the Sim goes hiking there is a chance they will find an unusual bug which will start a bug collection. This can be hung on a wall or put on a table. When  a Sim goes hiking he also runs the risk of being followed home by angry swarms of bees.

Science hobby items gained with FreeTime include an ant farm and new telescope interactions. Sims can now choose to search for planets, constellations and UFOs. Sims can also choose to summon aliens. When they use this interaction as an adult or teen, they get abducted, regardless of their gender, but only adult male Sims will become impregnated with an alien child.

Tinkering allows Sims to tinker various electronic devices in the house and also restoring a car to sell it for profit. The restored car can be painted to a different color. There is also a new train set which a Sim can decorate and design.

Secondary aspirations 
FreeTime adds the ability to assign secondary aspirations to Sims, and to avail of rewards/upgrades for fulfillment of primary wants filling the lifetime aspiration meter. These upgrades may be passive, context-sensitive, and reduce the speed at which the Sim depletes mood motives.

There are four upgrades in each of four categories: Life, Work, the Sim's current Aspiration, and Secondary Aspiration, which lets the Sim choose a secondary Aspiration, and then unlocks access to that Aspiration's first three upgrades. Sims with a secondary Aspiration will begin to exhibit Wants and Fears related to it.

Other additions 
Five new career tracks and their reward objects are added with FreeTime. These are oceanographers, entertainers, architects, dancers, and intelligence agents. Oceanographers can earn a koi pond, entertainers can get their own star of fame, architects can use their own drafting table, dancers can receive an improved ballet bar and intelligence agents can use a listening device.

The Lifetime Aspiration feature is enhanced in this expansion. It is displayed as a segmented bar next to the standard Aspiration meter, and for every segment filled the player is awarded a Lifetime Aspiration Point, which they can redeem on various new abilities.

FreeTime introduces new items, including a basketball hoop, pottery wheel, toddler activity table, modular synthesizer, hobby train table and others including new furniture for the nursery. The game also has outfits related to their hobby, for instance a Cuisine Sim can buy a dress with an apron. The sewing machine can be used by a Sim to make curtains for his or her home in colors.

Music 
A new soundtrack features the Natasha Bedingfield song "Pocketful of Sunshine", and also includes artists They Might Be Giants, and Datarock. Finally, players can create custom radio stations for their Sims stereos (though all songs added to custom stations must be in MP3 format).

Apartment Life 

The Sims 2: Apartment Life is the eighth and final expansion pack for The Sims 2, released in North America on August 25, 2008. A flyer included in later copies of some packs announced Apartment Life. Magic is re-introduced to the franchise, as well as new features like Sims' relationships with neighbors inhabiting the same apartment building, interacting with an NPC landlord, a new reputation system, and new activities for publicly accessible lots.

Pre-orders began on August 27, 2008, via Origin. A spin-off of Apartment Life and Pets, The Sims 2: Apartment Pets was released for Nintendo DS on August 26, 2008.

Gameplay

Belladonna Cove 
Apartment Life adds a new neighborhood named Belladonna Cove, inspired by New York City. It features many apartments, and San Francisco's Painted Ladies townhouses. Other buildings in this neighborhood include a trailer park, libraries, coffee shops, and grocery stores in addition to several parks. Several of these lots showcase major gameplay elements not available in previous expansions or the core game. When there is a family living in an apartment building, there will be a green apartment icon over the house.

Apartment Life adds several social interactions for Sims. Children have new special interactions to use with their peers, as do toddlers. Parents and teenagers can now also play "Peekaboo" with toddlers. Sims of aged Child and up can participate in the "Classic Dance" or "Jump Rope".

Apartment Life also lets Sims live in apartments in low or high-rent districts, and allows up to four user-controllable families within an apartment building. The player also has the option to look for roommates whom the player can choose, but not control. When the player reviews potential roommates the player is given a basic personality to help the player decide which roommate would best suit. Though roommates cannot be controlled, the player can view a scale that tells the player how satisfied they are.

Magic 
Apartment Life lets Sims become Witches (female) or Warlocks (male), similar to The Sims: Makin' Magic. While playing as a magical being, Sims may choose to be Infallibly Good, Good, Nice, Neutral, Mean, Evil or Atrociously Evil, each of which has a unique costume. A sim may become a witch or warlock by building a strong relationship with an NPC magic user until the option to request the transformation becomes available.

Witches/Warlocks may use various magical objects, including brooms and cauldrons. Spells may be cast by using specific ingredients (i.e. Mystic Dust, Dragon Scales, Eye of Newt, Vipers Essence, Crystallized Moonbeams, and the Essence of Light). These ingredients may be obtained in any of three ways: produced in a cauldron, purchased from a Witch/Warlock NPC, or purchased at the secret Witch/Warlock lots.

A character's alignment depends entirely on the alignment of the spells that they cast. A good spell will move the witch or warlock towards the "Infallibly Good" end, while an evil spell will push the caster towards the "Atrociously Evil" side. Spell availability is determined by the caster's magic skill level and alignment. The most potent powers of good and evil (such as Throne creation, zombification, revivification) are reserved exclusively for witches and warlocks on the extreme ends of the good or evil alignments. A Sim's initial alignment depends on the alignment of the witch or warlock who initiated them into the magical mysteries.

Witches/Warlocks can use certain spells and magic according to what order of magic they use. Evil magic users can light fires, cause sickness, and even bring zombies to life. Good magic users are able to create happiness, put out fires, and bring the dead back to life. Good and Evil magic users can each build a "Throne of Light" and "Throne of Darkness" respectively.

All Witches/Warlocks can create potions and cast "neutral" spells that allow them to teleport, freeze time, and use a spell or potion that turns them back into humans. Players with both Pets and Apartment Life will be able to have witch's spectral cats. Even if the player does not have Pets, 'lap dogs' are available for purchase in buy mode.

Other new additions 
Apartment Life adds a number of playground objects, including a jungle gym, playground slide, merry-go-round, and monkey bars. New furniture items include a Murphy bed, open mic stand, break dancing mat, trash chute, apartment mailboxes, vibrating bed, vending machines, witch-themed furnishings, in addition to new TV sets and a large fish tank.

Build mode adds new types of objects and tools, such as spiral stairs, a new elevator (in addition to all elevators previously included in Open for Business), built-in wardrobes, visible ceilings, heating and cooling windows as well as new wall, floor, garage door, and door styles. New modes of transport available are helicopters and witch brooms.

While the Sims are living in an apartment, as with university dorms, they will only be able to change the floors and wallpaper within the apartment, as well as place miscellaneous Build Mode objects like marble columns. Also new with Apartment Life is the ceiling. A new 45-degree angle view in build mode will make it possible to view the Sims' ceiling which can be covered in the floor tile of the player's choice.

New NPCs include butlers, landlords, roommates, and NPC neighbors. When players move playable Sims into an apartment, NPC characters will move into the other apartments if the player doesn't move other Sims into them.

There is now a new meter called the reputation meter, which shows how high the reputation of a Sim is, the more friendly the Sim is with others, the higher it goes. As the meter increases, the player gains rewards which help them with their occupation, aspiration, and living.

References 

The Sims 2 expansion packs
Electronic Arts games
MacOS games
Social simulation video games
Video games featuring protagonists of selectable gender
Windows games
Life simulation games
Aspyr games
Video games developed in the United States